Baccharoides anthelmintica is a species of perennial plant from family Asteraceae. It is native to South Asia and Eastern Africa. Its habitats include deciduous woodland, open dry forests, and riverine forests.

References 

anthelmintica

Flora of Afghanistan
Flora of China
Flora of the Indian subcontinent
Flora of Indo-China
Flora of East Tropical Africa
Flora of South Tropical Africa
Flora of Botswana
Flora of Namibia